The Eastern Intercollegiate Ski Association (EISA) is an NCAA skiing-only conference.  As the NCAA does not have divisions in skiing, it is composed of NCAA Division I, Division II, and Division III schools.

Current members
Bates College
Boston College (Alpine only)
Bowdoin College (Nordic only)
Colby College 
Colby-Sawyer College (Alpine only)
Dartmouth College
Harvard University
Middlebury College
Plymouth State University (Alpine only)
St. Lawrence University 
Saint Michael's College 
University of Maine at Presque Isle (Nordic only)
University of New Hampshire
University of Vermont
Williams College

External links
 http://www.eisaskiing.org/index.html
 http://donsnotes.com/sports/skiing-college.html

NCAA conferences
College skiing conferences in the United States